Pusillina is a genus of minute sea snails, marine gastropod mollusks or micromollusks in the family Rissoidae.

Species
Species within the genus Pusillina include:
 Pusillina amblia (Watson, 1886)
 † Pusillina aquensis Lozouet, 2015
 Pusillina benzi (Aradas & Maggiore, 1844)
 † Pusillina dollfusi Landau, Ceulemans & Van Dingenen, 2018 
 Pusillina ehrenbergii (Philippi, 1844)
 Pusillina fuscapex Gofas, 2007
 † Pusillina gallica Landau, Ceulemans & Van Dingenen, 2018 
 † Pusillina grateloupi (Vergneau-Saubade, 1968)
 Pusillina hadra Bouchet & Warén, 1993
 Pusillina harpa (A. E. Verrill, 1880)
 Pusillina harpula Gofas, 2007
 Pusillina inconspicua (Alder, 1844)
 † Pusillina kazakhstanica Amitrov, 2010
 † Pusillina lavallei Seguenza, 1903 
 Pusillina lineolata (Michaud, 1832)
 Pusillina marginata (Michaud, 1832)
 Pusillina metivieri Bouchet & Warén, 1993
 Pusillina minialba Segers, Swinnen & De Prins, 2009
 Pusillina munda (Monterosato, 1884)
 † Pusillina nilae Bogi & Chirli, 2004 
 Pusillina obscura (Philippi, 1844)
 Pusillina philippi (Aradas & Maggiore, 1844)
 Pusillina plicosa (E. A. Smith, 1875)
 † Pusillina protocarinata Lozouet, 2015 
 Pusillina radiata (Philippi, 1836)
 Pusillina sarsii (Lovén, 1846)
 Pusillina testudae (Verduin, 1979)
 Pusillina tumidula (G. O. Sars, 1878)
Species brought into synonymy
 Pusillina africana (Thiele, 1925): synonym of Haurakia africana (Thiele, 1925)
 Pusillina amica (Thiele, 1925): synonym of Haurakia amica (Thiele, 1925)
 Pusillina angulata (Hedley, 1907): synonym of Haurakia angulata (Hedley, 1907)
 Pusillina aupouria (Powell, 1937): synonym of Haurakia aupouria Powell, 1937: synonym of Alvania (Linemera) aupouria (Powell, 1937) represented as Alvania aupouria (Powell, 1937)
 Pusillina averni Ponder & Worsfold, 1994: synonym of Haurakia averni (Ponder & Worsfold, 1994)
 † Pusillina buccella (Marwick, 1931) : synonym of † Haurakia buccella Marwick, 1931 
 † Pusillina chemnitzia (Laws, 1948) : synonym of † Haurakia chemnitzia Laws, 1948
 Pusillina crassicosta (Powell, 1955): synonym of Haurakia crassicosta Powell, 1955
 Pusillina denseclathrata (Thiele, 1925): synonym of Haurakia denseclathrata (Thiele, 1925)
 Pusillina discrepans (Tate & May, 1900): synonym of Haurakia discrepans (Tate & May, 1900)
 Pusillina diversa (F. Nordsieck, 1972): synonym of Pusillina inconspicua (Alder, 1844)
 Pusillina dolium (Nyst, 1845): synonym of Pusillina philippi (Aradas & Maggiore, 1844)
 Pusillina ehrenbergii (Philippi, 1844): synonym of Pusillina ehrenbergii (Philippi, 1844) (incorrect subsequent spelling)
 Pusillina finlayi (Powell, 1937): synonym of Haurakia finlayi Powell, 1937
 Pusillina gilva (W. H. Turton, 1932): synonym of Haurakia gilva (W. H. Turton, 1932)
 Pusillina hamiltoni (Suter, 1898): synonym of Haurakia hamiltoni (Suter, 1898)
 Pusillina hertzogi (Thiele, 1925): synonym of Haurakia hertzogi (Thiele, 1925)
 Pusillina huttoni (Suter, 1898): synonym of Haurakia huttoni (Suter, 1898)
 Pusillina imitator (Thiele, 1930): synonym of Haurakia imitator (Thiele, 1930)
 Pusillina infecta (Suter, 1908): synonym of Haurakia infecta (Suter, 1908)
 Pusillina janusi (Nordsieck, 1972): synonym of Rissoa janusi (Nordsieck, 1972)
 Pusillina latiambita (Ponder, 1967): synonym of Haurakia latiambita (Ponder, 1967)
 Pusillina marmorata (Hedley, 1907): synonym of Haurakia marmorata (Hedley, 1907)
 † Pusillina marshalli (Grant-Mackie & Chapman-Smith, 1971): synonym of Haurakia marshalli (Grant-Mackie & Chapman-Smith, 1971)
 Pusillina mediolaevis (Cotton, 1944): synonym of Haurakia mediolaevis Cotton, 1944
 Pusillina minuscula (Powell, 1955): synonym of Haurakia minuscula Powell, 1955
 Pusillina mobilicosta (Ponder, 1967): synonym of Haurakia mobilicosta (Ponder, 1967)
  † Pusillina oamarutica (Finlay, 1924): synonym of  † Haurakia oamarutica Finlay, 1924
 Pusillina occulta (Thiele, 1925): synonym of Haurakia occulta (Thiele, 1925)
  † Pusillina onerata (Laws, 1939): synonym of  † Haurakia onerata Laws, 1939
 Pusillina otagoensis (Dell, 1956): synonym of Haurakia otagoensis Dell, 1956
 Pusillina parva (da Costa, 1778): synonym of Rissoa parva (da Costa, 1778)
 Pusillina pellucida (Powell, 1937): synonym of Haurakia pellucida (Powell, 1937)
 Pusillina praeda (Hedley, 1908): synonym of Haurakia praeda (Hedley, 1908)
 Pusillina profundior (Hedley, 1907): synonym of Haurakia profundior (Hedley, 1907)
 Pusillina quisquiliarum (Watson, 1886): synonym of Setia quisquiliarum (Watson, 1886)
 Pusillina relativa (Laseron, 1956): synonym of Haurakia relativa (Laseron, 1956)
 Pusillina sarsi [sic]: synonym of Pusillina sarsii (Lovén, 1846)
 Pusillina semireticulata (Murdoch & Suter, 1906): synonym of Haurakia semireticulata (Murdoch & Suter, 1906)
 Pusillina sinuastoma (Ponder, 1967): synonym of Haurakia sinuastoma (Ponder, 1967)
 † Pusillina sodalis (Laws, 1939) : synonym of † Haurakia sodalis Laws, 1939 
 Pusillina subsuturalis (Dell, 1956): synonym of Haurakia subsuturalis Dell, 1956
 Pusillina sufflava Cecalupo & Perugia, 2009: represented as Pusillina (Haurakia) sufflava Cecalupo & Perugia, 2009: synonym of Haurakia sufflava (Cecalupo & Perugia, 2009)
 † Pusillina tenuisculpta (Laws, 1950): synonym of † Haurakia tenuisculpta Laws, 1950 
 Pusillina wallacei]' (W. R. B. Oliver, 1915): synonym of Haurakia wallacei'' (Oliver, 1915)

References

 Nordsieck, F. (1972). Die europäischen Meeresschnecken (Opisthobranchia mit Pyramidellidae; Rissoacea). Vom Eismeer bis Kapverden, Mittelmeer und Schwarzes Meer. Gustav Fischer, Stuttgart. XIII + 327 pp.
 Verduin A. (1979). Rissoa (Turgidina) testudae subg. nov., sp. nov. A marine gastropod from the Straits of Gibraltar. Basteria 43: 47-50
 Spencer, H.G., Marshall, B.A. & Willan, R.C. (2009). Checklist of New Zealand living Mollusca. Pp 196-219. in: Gordon, D.P. (ed.) New Zealand inventory of biodiversity. Volume one. Kingdom Animalia: Radiata, Lophotrochozoa, Deuterostomia. Canterbury University Press,

External links
 Monterosato T. A. (di) (1884). Nomenclatura generica e specifica di alcune conchiglie mediterranee. Palermo, Virzi, 152 pp
 Ponder, W. F. (1985). A review of the genera of the Rissoidae (Mollusca: Mesogastropoda: Rissoacea). Records of the Australian Museum. Suppl. 4: 1-221
 Gofas, S.; Le Renard, J.; Bouchet, P. (2001). Mollusca. in: Costello, M.J. et al. (eds), European Register of Marine Species: a check-list of the marine species in Europe and a bibliography of guides to their identification. Patrimoines Naturels. 50: 180-213 

Rissoidae
Gastropod genera